Dame Melanie Henrietta Dawes  (born 9 March 1966) is a British economist and civil servant. Since February 2020 she has been Chief Executive of Ofcom. She was previously the Permanent Secretary of the Ministry of Housing, Communities and Local Government, and before that worked at HM Treasury, HM Revenue and Customs, and in the Cabinet Office. She is a Trustee of the Patchwork Foundation, founded by Harris Bokhari.

Early life and education
Dawes was born on 9 March 1966. She was educated at Malvern Girls' College, then an all-girls private school in Malvern, Worcestershire. She studied at New College, Oxford, graduating with a Bachelor of Arts (BA) degree. She then undertook postgraduate studies in economics at Birkbeck College, London, graduating with a Master of Science (MSc) degree.

Career
Dawes joined Civil Service in 1989. After two years at the Department for Transport, she spent 15 years at HM Treasury, ending her time there in the role of Europe Director from 2002 to 2006. Then, from 2006 to 2011, she worked at HM Revenue and Customs (HMRC). She was Director General for Business Tax at HMRC from November 2007, replacing Dave Hartnett. From October 2011 to 2015, she was Director General of the Economic and Domestic Secretariat in the Cabinet Office.

In January 2015, Dawes was announced as the next Permanent Secretary of the Department for Communities and Local Government, succeeding Sir Bob Kerslake. She was the first permanent secretary to be appointed under a new scheme in which the Prime Minister has the final say in the recruitment process; the PM now chooses directly from a list created by the Civil Service Commissioners, rather than only having a veto over the Commissioners' preferred candidate. She took up the position on 1 March 2015. As of 2015, Dawes was paid a salary of between £160,000 and £164,999 by DCLG, making her one of the 328 most highly paid people in the British public sector at that time.

On 12 February 2020, Dawes was named as the new Chief Executive of broadcasting, telecoms and postal services regulator Ofcom.

Other work
Dawes was Chair of the Alcohol Recovery Project from 2003 to 2005. She was a Member of the Council of Which? between 2011 and 2015. She was the Civil Service Gender Champion from 2015 to 2019, when she was appointed as the overall Civil Service Diversity and Inclusion Champion. She was a judge for the 2015 Civil Service Diversity and Inclusion Awards. Dawes is a trustee of the Patchwork Foundation.

Personal life
In 1992, Dawes married Benedict Brogan. Together they have a daughter.

Honours
Dawes was appointed Companion of the Order of the Bath (CB) in the 2013 Birthday Honours for "services to the Civil Service in the field of Economic Policy" and Dame Commander of the Order of the Bath (DCB) in the 2020 New Year Honours for public service.

References

Offices held 
 

 
 

 
 

 
 

1966 births
Living people
British economists
British civil servants
British women economists
Women civil servants
Civil servants in HM Treasury
Civil servants in HM Revenue and Customs
Civil servants in the Cabinet Office
Dames Commander of the Order of the Bath
People educated at Malvern St James
Alumni of New College, Oxford
Alumni of Birkbeck, University of London